John Getty (born 23 April 1918, date of death unknown) was a Scottish footballer who played for Dumbarton and Nottingham Forest. Getty is deceased.

References

1918 births
Year of death missing
Scottish footballers
Dumbarton F.C. players
Nottingham Forest F.C. players
Scottish Football League players
English Football League players
People from Bonhill
Association football forwards
Footballers from West Dunbartonshire